Nessa Robins is an Irish food writer, blogger and photographer from County Westmeath, Ireland. She is best known for her award-winning cookbook and food blog. She also writes a monthly recipe column in the Irish Farmers Journal.

Early life 
Robins grew up in Moate, County Westmeath, Ireland. She trained as a nurse in St. James's Hospital, Dublin, before completing a bachelor's degree in nursing studies in Trinity College Dublin. She worked in many areas of nursing until having her third child.

Food career 
In 2008, Robins took a break from nursing to pursue a career in food. She hosted cookery classes from her hometown and gave live demonstrations at many food festivals in Ireland, including Bloom, Taste of Dublin and at the National Ploughing Championships alongside Irish chef Neven Maguire.

Robins started a blog in 2010 called Nessa's Family Kitchen, for which she was named the Best Newcomer at the 2011 Irish Blog Awards. In May 2013 her first book, Apron Strings: Recipes from a Family Kitchen, was published by New Island Books. The book went on to win 'Best First Cookbook' in Ireland in the Gourmand Cookbook Awards. Robins currently writes a monthly column, Home Nurse, in the Irish Farmers Journal based on recipes from the cookbook.

Robins is also a member of the Irish Food Writers' Guild. She has also worked as an ambassador for Lidl and Flora.

Personal life 
Robins lives in Moate, County Westmeath with her husband Diarmuid and their four children.

Filmography

Bibliography 
2013: Apron Strings: Recipes from a Family Kitchen  

2014: Nessa's Christmas Kitchen

References 

Women cookbook writers
21st-century Irish people
People from County Westmeath
Irish columnists
Irish women columnists
Alumni of Trinity College Dublin
Living people
Year of birth missing (living people)